Mario Alberto Torres Hernández (20 June 1931 – 26 April 1975) was a Chilean footballer. He played in 11 matches for the Chile national football team from 1954 to 1959. He was also part of Chile's squad for the 1957 South American Championship.

References

External links
 

1931 births
1975 deaths
Chilean footballers
Chile international footballers
Place of birth missing
Association football defenders
Audax Italiano footballers